Copán is one of the departments in the western part of Honduras. The departmental capital is the town of Santa Rosa de Copán.  The department is well known for its tobacco and fine cigars.

The department is famous for its Pre-Columbian archaeological site at Copán, one of the greatest cities of the Maya civilization.

The department of Copán covers a total surface area of 3,242 km2 and, in 2015, had an estimated population of about 382,722 people.

Etymology
The name "Copán" is from the mayan Ch'orti' language.

History 

The territory that today is the department was inhabited by the Maya-Chortis civilization in the west and north; and Lenca in the extreme south. Its name "Copán" is due to the chief Copán Galel, a warrior who defended his lands before the Spanish colonization. This territory was within the jurisdiction of the colonial city of Gracias a Dios and until May 28, 1869, it was within the jurisdiction of the department of Lempira. On that date it was officially created as the Department of Copán and the city of Santa Rosa de Copán was named as the capital, during the administration of Captain General Don José María Medina.

Economy 

The Department of Copán is a geographically mountainous area, its main source of income is tourism to the Mayan archaeological sites, followed by the cultivation and production of coffee, tobacco, livestock, agriculture of vegetables and basic grains, production of articles in leather or saddlery, industrial products, etc.

Municipalities

References

 
Departments of Honduras